Bjørn Vade (2 May 1922 – 30 May 2006) was a Norwegian middle-distance runner. He was born in Kristiania, and represented the sports club IK Tjalve. He competed in 400 m and 800 m at the 1948 Summer Olympics in London.

References

External links

1922 births
2006 deaths
Athletes from Oslo
Norwegian male middle-distance runners
Athletes (track and field) at the 1948 Summer Olympics
Olympic athletes of Norway